Born to the West is a 1926 American adventure silent film directed by John Waters and written by Zane Grey and Lucien Hubbard. The film stars Jack Holt, Margaret Morris, Raymond Hatton, Arlette Marchal, George Siegmann, Bruce Gordon and William A. Carroll. The film was released on June 14, 1926, by Paramount Pictures.

Cast 
Jack Holt as 'Colorado' Dare Rudd
Margaret Morris as Nell Worstall
Raymond Hatton as Jim Fallon
Arlette Marchal as Belle of Paradise Bar
George Siegmann as Jesse Fillmore
Bruce Gordon as Bate Fillmore
William A. Carroll	as Nell's Father
Tom Kennedy as Dinkey Hooley
Richard Neill as Sheriff Haverill
Edith Yorke as Mrs. Rudd
E. Alyn Warren as Sam Rudd
Billy Aber as 'Colorado' Dare Rudd, as a child
Jean Johnston as Nell Worstall, as a child
Joe Butterworth as Bate Fillmore, as a child

References

External links 
 

1926 films
1920s English-language films
American adventure films
1926 adventure films
Paramount Pictures films
Films directed by John Waters (director born 1893)
American black-and-white films
American silent feature films
Silent adventure films
1920s American films